Kheyrabad (also Romanized as Kheyrābād) is a village in Razan Rural District, in the Central District of Razan County, Hamadan Province, Iran. At the 2006 census, its population was 21, in 5 families.

References 

Populated places in Razan County